Nandini Srikar (born 10 August 1969) is an Indian singer and performer. Her popular songs include Jo Bheji thi Duaa from the Bollywood movie, Shanghai, "Bhare Naina" from Ra.One and "Kannamma" from Rekka.

Early life

She was born in Hyderabad, India. She went to school and university there. Her mother, Shakunthala Chellappa, was a Carnatic vocalist and Hindustani Sitar player. As a child, she studied classical music, learning how to play veena at age three. She later learned sitar and guitar and Bharatanatyam.  She earned a master's degree in pure Mathematics from Osmania University and a degree in information systems management.

Career
Srikar after graduation, worked in software in Pune. She originally had no intention of becoming a professional musician and pursued music only as a hobby.

In 1997, playback singer Hariharan heard her song and suggested to Vidyasagar that he hire her to sing for his upcoming film Uyirodu Uyiraga. In the film, she performed a duet with KK called "I Love You" and the song became a hit. She quit her job and focused on music, collaborating with Ranjit Barot, Trilok Gurtu and Wally Badarou. She also began to write advertising jingles. In 2001, she appeared on Mahmood Khan's album Panah.

In 2008, she worked with music director Dhruv Ghanekar with the vocal arrangements and harmonies for the songs in Drona. Her debut solo album Beete Pal was released in 2011 in which she has composed, programmed, produced and performed all the songs. The album features Kai Eckhardt (Bass), Prasanna (Guitar), Michael Pope (Bass), Steve Zerlin (Bass), Atma Anur (Drums), Ed DeGenaro (Guitar) and other musicians. Her next venture is a collaboration with Shri and DJ Badmarsh.

In year 2016, she also worked for a Pakistani movie Hijrat (film) (directed by Farouq Mengal and produced by FM Productions). She sang an item song "Chali Re Chali" and Sana Nawaz (a popular Pakistani actress) appeared in the song.

In 2021, she collaborated with duo gardenstate in their song, “Aurora”.

She is married and  speaks Tamil, English, Hindi and Telugu.

Discography
2001 Panah
2011 Beete Pal

Filmography as playback singer

Hindi songs
Abhay (Zingoria)
 2004 Morning Raga
 2005 Brides Wanted
 2005 Hanuman
 2006 Humko Deewana Kar Gaye
 2007 Johnny Gaddaar (Tamil)
 2008 Drona
 2009 Three – Love, Lies and Betrayal
 2009 Barah Aana
 2011 Ra.One(Bhare Naina)
 2012 Agent Vinod (Dil Mera Muft ka)
 2012 Shanghai (2012 film) (Duaa) 
 2013 "Club 60" (Mera Saaya)
 2014 Queen (Harjaiyaan) (Hindi)
 2015 Runh (Samjena) (Marathi)
 2016 Fitoor (Hone Do Batiyan)
 2016 Nil Battey Sannata (Maula)
 2016 Hijrat (film) (Chali Re Chali) (Urdu)
2017 Vimaanam (Anthimaanam Mele) (Malayalam)

Tamil songs
 1998 Uyirodu Uyiraga - I Love You
 2001 Aalavandhan - Africa kaattupuli
 2003 Joot - Kattabomma
 2007 Urchagam - Narampookkal
 2013 Moondru Per Moondru Kaadhal - Aaha Kaadhal
 2014 Nerungi vaa muthamidadhe - Yaar
 2016 Rekka - Kannamma Kannamma
 2022 Valimai - Enna Kuraiyo

Television 
 Taare Ankboot (2013)
 Ishq Main Aisa Haal Bhi Hona Hai (2014)
 Kambakht Tanno (2016)
 Shehrnaz (2017)
 Ahsas (2017)
 Haara Dil (2018)
 Sodai  (2018)

Awards
(GiMA 2012)- Nandini Srikar won the best playback singer female for her song Bhare Naina in Ra.One.
Mirchi Music Awards South 2014 - Nandini Srikar won the best female singer of the year award for her song "Aaha Kaadhal" from Moondru Per Moondru Kaadhal.
Southern India Cinematographers' Association - SICA Award 2015 - Nandini Srikar won the best female singer of the year award for her song "Harjaiyaan" from the film Queen. She also won Norway Tamil awards  - Best Playback singer  for Kannamma for Movie Rekka

References

External links
Official website

Indian guitarists
Indian women playback singers
Indian women singer-songwriters
Indian singer-songwriters
1969 births
Living people
Tamil playback singers
Indian women classical singers
20th-century Indian singers
21st-century Indian singers
20th-century guitarists
21st-century guitarists
20th-century Indian women singers
21st-century Indian women singers
Film musicians from Andhra Pradesh
Singers from Hyderabad, India
Women musicians from Andhra Pradesh
20th-century women guitarists
21st-century women guitarists